Jingmei is a railway station on the Taiwan Railways Administration North-link line located in Xiulin Township, Hualien County, Taiwan.

History
The station was opened on 26 July 1975.

See also
 List of railway stations in Taiwan

References

External links 

1975 establishments in Taiwan
Railway stations in Hualien County
Railway stations opened in 1975
Railway stations served by Taiwan Railways Administration